William James Fellowes (15 March 1910 – 1987) was an English footballer who played as a half back in the Football League for Plymouth Argyle, Clapton Orient, Luton Town and Exeter City. He was born in Bradford.

References

1910 births
1987 deaths
Footballers from Bradford
English footballers
Tavistock A.F.C. players
Plymouth Argyle F.C. players
Leyton Orient F.C. players
Luton Town F.C. players
Exeter City F.C. players
English Football League players
Association football midfielders